Transformation may refer to:

Science and mathematics

In biology and medicine
 Metamorphosis, the biological process of changing physical form after birth or hatching
 Malignant transformation, the process of cells becoming cancerous
 Transformation (genetics), genetic alteration of a cell by DNA uptake

In mathematics

 Transformation (function), concerning functions from sets to themselves. For functions in the broader sense, see function (mathematics).
Affine transformation, in geometry
Linear transformation between modules in linear algebra. Also called a linear map.
Transformation matrix which represent linear maps in linear algebra.
Integral transform, between a function in one domain to a function in another
 Natural transformation between functors in category theory.
 Unitary transformation, between two Hilbert spaces
 Geometric transformation, between sets of points in geometry
Infinitesimal transformation, a limiting case of a geometrical transformation

In physics and chemistry
 Chemical transformation
 Phase transformation, a physical transition from one medium to another
 Transformation optics, generalized optical devices
 Unitary transformation (quantum mechanics)

In other sciences
 Transformation problem, a concept in economics
 Transformation (linguistics), a type of operation in transformational grammar
 Transformation of precious metals, see synthesis of precious metals
Data transformation (statistics)

Arts and entertainment

In music
 Transformation (music)
 Transformation (Don Preston album), 2001
 Transformation (Tal Wilkenfeld album), 2007
 Transformation (Signal Aout 42 album)
 Transformation (Alex Skolnick Trio album)
 "Transformation", a song by Nona Hendryx
 Transformations (opera), a chamber opera by the American composer Conrad Susa
 The Transformation (album)

In other arts and entertainment
 Transformation (novel), by Carol Berg
 Transformation, an alternate title for The Marble Faun, a novel by Nathaniel Hawthorne
 "The Transformation", an episode of  American television series Fringe
 Transformation playing card
 "Transformation" (short story), a short story by Mary Shelley

In business and technology

In business 
 Business transformation, a major change in the identity, structure, or purpose of an organization (from the field of strategic management)
 Transformation (law), a concept in copyright law
 Transformation (patent law)
 Transformation design, a design process
 Transformational leadership, a managerial approach emphasizing organizational change
 Maturity transformation, the practice of fractional reserve banks borrowing money on shorter timeframes than they lend money out
 Digital transformation

In computing
 Data transformation
 Model transformation
 Program transformation
 XML transformation
 Transformation of text

Other uses
 Transformation (journal), an academic journal in the field of Biblical studies
 Transformation (warfare)
 Transformation of culture
 Transformational festival
 Spiritual transformation, a fundamental change in an individual (a psychological and New-Age concept)
 Shapeshifting, a type of transformation common in mythology and folklore

See also
 Transform (disambiguation)
 Transmutation (disambiguation)